Vyazemsky (masculine), Vyazemskaya (feminine), or Vyazemskoye (neuter) is the name of several inhabited localities in Russia.

Urban localities
Vyazemsky, Khabarovsk Krai, a town in Vyazemsky District of Khabarovsk Krai

Rural localities
Vyazemsky, Smolensk Oblast, a selo in Vyazemsky District of Smolensk Oblast
Vyazemskoye (rural locality), a village in Mozhaysky District of Moscow Oblast